Alejandro Alvarado García (January 9, 1839, León, Nicaragua – September 11, 1922) was a Costa Rican politician. In 1904 he was elected president of the Supreme Court of Costa Rica for the period 1904–1908.

References

1839 births
1922 deaths
People from León, Nicaragua
Costa Rican people of Spanish descent
Costa Rican politicians
Supreme Court of Justice of Costa Rica judges